Gyrotaenia spicata is a species of plant in the family Urticaceae. It is endemic to Jamaica. it is also known as urera spicata

References

spicata
Near threatened plants
Endemic flora of Jamaica
Taxonomy articles created by Polbot